Westwood Lakes is a census-designated place and unincorporated part of Miami-Dade County, Florida, United States. The population was 11,373 at the 2020 census.

Geography
It is bordered to the north by Westchester, to the east by Olympia Heights, to the south by Sunset, and to the west by Kendale Lakes.

Demographics

2020 census

As of the 2020 United States census, there were 11,373 people, 3,192 households, and 2,533 families residing in the CDP.

2000 census
As of the census of 2000, there were 12,005 people, 3,477 households, and 2,969 families residing in the CDP. The racial makeup of the CDP was 92.95% White (22% were Non-Hispanic White,) 0.79% African American, 0.09% Native American, 1.07% Asian, 2.87% from other races, and 2.22% from two or more races. Hispanic or Latino of any race were 76.33% of the population.

There were 3,477 households, out of which 33.6% had children under the age of 18 living with them, 65.5% were married couples living together, 15.0% had a female householder with no husband present, and 14.6% were non-families. 10.8% of all households were made up of individuals, and 5.4% had someone living alone who was 65 years of age or older. The average household size was 3.41 and the average family size was 3.54.

In the CDP, the population was spread out, with 21.1% under the age of 18, 7.7% from 18 to 24, 28.8% from 25 to 44, 25.3% from 45 to 64, and 17.0% who were 65 years of age or older. The median age was 39 years. For every 100 females, there were 92.0 males. For every 100 females age 18 and over, there were 89.4 males.

The median income for a household in the CDP was $44,602, and the median income for a family was $46,262. Males had a median income of $27,416 versus $24,896 for females. The per capita income for the CDP was $16,044. About 7.4% of families and 9.6% of the population were below the poverty line, including 12.7% of those under age 18 and 10.3% of those age 65 or over.

As of 2000, speakers of Spanish as a first language accounted for 79.96% of residents, and English was the primary language of 20.03% of the population.

Education

Primary and secondary schools
Miami-Dade County Public Schools operates public schools in Westwood Lakes. Elementary schools in Westwood Lakes include Royal Palm, and Tropical. Riviera Middle School is located in Westwood Lakes, as is Cypress K-8 Center.

St. Timothy Parish School of the Roman Catholic Archdiocese of Miami is located in Westwood Lakes.

References

Census-designated places in Miami-Dade County, Florida
Census-designated places in Florida